The rivière du Malin (English: Malin river) is a tributary of the Jacques-Cartier River, located in the unorganized territory of Lac-Jacques-Cartier, in the La Côte-de-Beaupré Regional County Municipality, in the administrative region of Capitale-Nationale, in Quebec, Canada. The course of the river passes in particular in the Laurentides Wildlife Reserve.

Forestry is the main economic activity in the sector; recreational tourism, second.

The surface of the Malin River (except the rapids areas) is generally frozen from the beginning of December to the end of March, but the safe circulation on the ice is generally made from the end of December to the beginning of March.

Geography 
The main watersheds neighboring the Malin River are:
 north side: Jacques-Cartier River, rivière du Milieu;
 east side: Jacques-Cartier River, Chartier lake, Archambault Lake, Rocheuse River, Montmorency River;
 south side: Rocheuse River, Lac des Alliés, Fragasso Lake, Walsh Lake, rivière à la Chute;
 west side: Jacques-Cartier River, rivière Jacques-Cartier Nord-Ouest.

The Rocheuse river draws its source from Lanoraye Lake, located in the unorganized territory of Lac-Jacques-Cartier, in the La Côte-de-Beaupré Regional County Municipality. This lake resembling a rectangle with rounded corners, includes an island and a peninsula attached to the northeast shore.

  to the south, forming a large curve towards the east and descending in an increasingly steep valley, to an unidentified stream (coming from the northwest);
  south almost in a straight line in a very deep valley before and branching south-west until the confluence of the Rocheuse River (coming from the south);
  south-west in a very deep valley, branching south to its mouth.

Toponymy 
The toponym "Rivière du Malin" was formalized on November 7, 1985 at the Place Names Bank of the Commission de toponymie du Québec.

Notes and references

See also 

 Laurentides Wildlife Reserve
 Lac-Jacques-Cartier, a TNO
 La Côte-de-Beaupré Regional County Municipality
 Rocheuse River
 Jacques-Cartier River
 Lanoraye Lake
 List of rivers of Quebec

External links 
 Réserve faunique des Laurentides

Rivers of Capitale-Nationale
La Côte-de-Beaupré Regional County Municipality